Mararikulam is a village in India, in the district of Alappuzha, Kerala state. Previously, it was a constituency in the Kerala Legislative Assembly, represented by notable legislators like T. M. Thomas Isaac, V. S. Achuthanandan. It is the place of former international volleyball player K. Udayakumar. Marari Beach at Mararikulam is a notable tourist destination here.

References
K. Udayakumar

 Villages in Alappuzha district